Lord Turnbull may refer to:

Andrew Turnbull, Baron Turnbull, English civil servant 
Alan Turnbull, Lord Turnbull, Scottish judge